Lodz Papers in Pragmatics is a Polish linguistics journal owned by the University of Łódź and was previously published by Versita Open. The journal was launched in 2012. The founder is Piotr Cap. It is published biannually by De Gruyter. It is available gratis on the internet.  The journal is peer-reviewed and focuses on pragmatics.

References

Pragmatics journals
Polish-language journals
Publications established in 2012
Academic journals published in Poland